Ivan Sproule (born 18 February 1981) is a Northern Irish retired professional footballer who was most recently manager of NIFL Championship side Dergview. Early in his career, Sproule played in Northern Ireland for Omagh Town and Institute. He became a full-time professional in January 2005, after he signed for Scottish Premier League side Hibernian, just a month before his 24th birthday. He made a significant impact at Hibernian, scoring a hat-trick against Rangers and earning selection by the Northern Ireland national team.

Sproule moved to Football League Championship club Bristol City in 2007. After four years with the club, including loan spells at Yeovil Town and Notts County in his final season, Sproule agreed to return to Hibernian in May 2011, where he spent two more seasons. After a year with Ross County, Sproule returned to Northern Ireland.

Career

Sproule, a winger who was known for his explosive pace, played in the Irish Football League for semi-professional clubs Omagh Town and Institute. He combined playing football with his full-time career as an engineer. Scottish Premier League club Hibernian invited him for a trial in January 2005, after he had been transfer listed by Institute. He impressed manager Tony Mowbray and signed as a full-time professional until the end of the season, which meant that he had to give up his day job as a fabrication engineer. Hibs paid Institute a transfer fee of £5,000.

The gamble of signing a player from outside professional football paid off for both Sproule and Hibs. Although he had a slow start with Hibs and it was rumoured that he would return to Northern Ireland, he scored one of the goals in a 3–1 win over Celtic at Celtic Park. Sproule was offered an extended contract which he accepted. Sproule hit the headlines in August 2005 by scoring a hat-trick in a 3–0 defeat of champions Rangers at Ibrox Stadium. His performances caused Sproule to be linked with a £1 million move to Ukrainian club FC Dnipro Dnipropetrovsk, who had played against Hibs in the 2005–06 UEFA Cup.

Sproule caused further damage to Rangers by helping Hibs eliminate them from the 2005–06 Scottish Cup. Sproule scored one goal and assisted with another, as Hibs again won 3–0 at Ibrox. He was part of the team that won the 2007 Scottish League Cup Final. In total, Sproule made 94 appearances in his first spell with Hibs, scoring 18 goals.

Sproule joined Bristol City on a three-year contract on 27 June 2007 for an undisclosed fee, believed to be about £500,000. He made his debut for the West Country club on 29 August 2007 against Manchester City in the League Cup. He was made to sit out the first four games of the season due to a suspension which he received while playing for Hibernian. He scored his first goal for Bristol City on 24 October 2007 in their 2–1 victory over Southampton. Sproule was part of the Bristol City squad who were beaten in the Championship 2008 play-off final against Hull City.

Sproule fell out of favour at Bristol City in 2010, making his last start for the first team in August. He was loaned to Yeovil Town in November. He was then loaned to Notts County in March 2011.

In April 2011, Sproule held discussions with Colin Calderwood about a proposed return to Hibernian. Sproule signed a pre-contract agreement with the club a month later. On the opening game of the season, he played his first Hibs match in a 2–0 loss against Celtic; scored on his first match two months later, in a 3–2 win over St Johnstone. Sproule fell out of favour at Hibs during the 2012–13 season, making only one starting appearance.

Sproule moved to Ross County on a free transfer in January 2013. He scored two goals in his first appearance for the club, in a 4–1 victory at St Mirren on 19 January. After the match, Manager Derek Adams praised Sproule's performance, while Sproule, himself, say his debut was a 'dream' A week later, Sproule scored again but this time was against his former club Hibs in a 1–0 win. Sproule scored 8 goals in 24 appearances for Ross County, but decided to leave the club in November 2013 due to personal reasons.

Sproule agreed in December 2013 to sign for Linfield.

International career
Sproule was called into the Northern Ireland squad for the first time in September 2005, immediately after his hat-trick for Hibernian against Rangers. He came on as a substitute in the 1–0 win against England at Windsor Park to win his first cap. Sproule scored a goal on his first start for Northern Ireland, against Estonia on 1 March 2006. Sproule made a total of 11 appearances for Northern Ireland between 2005 and 2007.

Scottish and English career statistics

International caps
Scores and results list Northern Ireland's goal tally first.

Personal life
Sproule is married and has three sons. A second child was stillborn in November 2009, causing him to miss Bristol City's match against Nottingham Forest. City manager Gary Johnson dedicated their equalising goal in the match to Sproule, who had sent a message of support to his teammates. Johnson commented:

References

External links
 Ivan Sproule profile at bcfc.co.uk
 

1981 births
Living people
People from Castlederg
Association football wingers
Association footballers from Northern Ireland
Northern Ireland international footballers
Moyola Park F.C. players
Omagh Town F.C. players
Institute F.C. players
Hibernian F.C. players
Bristol City F.C. players
NIFL Premiership players
Scottish Premier League players
English Football League players
Yeovil Town F.C. players
Notts County F.C. players
Ross County F.C. players
Scottish Professional Football League players
Linfield F.C. players
Expatriate association footballers from Northern Ireland
Expatriate footballers in England
Expatriate footballers in Scotland